Karthago can refer to:

 Karthago (band), a Hungarian rock band.
 Karthago (German band), a West Berlin–based rock band, pioneers of the Krautrock
 Karthago (musical company), a Belgian musical company, located in Ghent.
 Carthage, the city in Tunisia, North Africa.
 Karthago Airlines, a Tunisian charter airline.